EQV may refer to:

Logical biconditional, a type of logical connective
Logical equality, a logical operator
Mercedes-Benz Concept EQV, a concept van in the Mercedes-Benz EQ family of battery-electric vehicles
Mercedes-Benz EQV, an electric minivan, version of the Vito
EQV, a band founded by Margita Stefanović

See also

equivalence (disambiguation)
EQW
Equ